Yaba-chō (矢場町) is a historic neighbourhood located in the Naka ward of Nagoya. 

It is located next to Sakae. It is served by the Yabachō Station of the Meijo line.

Neighbourhoods of Nagoya